Suppressor of cytokine signaling 2 is a protein that in humans is encoded by the SOCS2 gene.

This gene encodes a member of the STAT-induced STAT inhibitor (SSI), also known as suppressor of cytokine signalling (SOCS), family. SSI family members are cytokine-inducible negative regulators of cytokine signaling. The expression of this gene can be induced by a subset of cytokines, including erythropoietin, GM-CSF, IL10 and interferon-gamma (IFN-gamma). The protein encoded by this gene is found to interact with the cytoplasmic domain of insulin-like growth factor 1 receptor (IGF1R), and thus is thought to be involved in the regulation of IGF1R mediated cell signaling. Knockout studies in mice also suggested a regulatory role of this gene in IGF-1 related growth control.

Interactions 

SOCS2 has been shown to interact with insulin-like growth factor 1 receptor and erythropoietin receptor. Additionally, it acts as a substrate recognition subunit of a Cullin5 E3 ubiquitin ligase complex. It is under investigation for use in targeted protein degradation.

References

Further reading

External links